Cycling was contested at the 1990 Asian Games in Changping Velodrome, Beijing, China from September 24 to October 1.

Medalists

Road

Men

Women

Track

Men

Women

Medal table

References 
 New Straits Times, September 25 – October 2, 1990

External links 
 Olympic Council of Asia

 
1990 Asian Games events
1990
Asian Games
1990 in road cycling
1990 in track cycling
International cycle races hosted by China